Alesana Sione (born 28 July 1966) is an Olympic weightlifter and wrestler from American Samoa.

Sione competed at the 1988 Summer Olympics in the wrestling 100 kg, but he lost both of his preliminary matches so did not advance to the next round. Twelve years later at the 2000 Summer Olympics he competed in the weightlifting 105 kg and came 20th out of the 24 starters.

References

External links
 

1966 births
Living people
American Samoan male weightlifters
American people of Samoan descent
Olympic weightlifters of American Samoa
Weightlifters at the 2000 Summer Olympics
American Samoan male sport wrestlers
Olympic wrestlers of American Samoa
Wrestlers at the 1988 Summer Olympics